Nine ships of the Royal Navy have borne the name HMS Speedy:

  was a 14 gun sloop-of-war, launched in 1782. The French captured her again in 1801, whilst she was in the Mediterranean Sea, and donated her to the Papal Navy, She was struck in 1806. 
  was a gunboat serving on the Canadian Great Lakes. She was launched in 1798 and foundered in 1804.
  was a brig-sloop, formerly George Herbert, purchased in 1803 and sold in 1818 for use as a floating chapel. The chapel was used until 1834 then she was broken up.
  was a six-gun cutter launched in 1828, converted to a dockyard mooring lighter in 1853 and renamed YC.11 and broken up in 1866.
  was a torpedo gunboat launched in 1893 and sunk by a mine in the Humber estuary in 1914.
  was an  launched in 1918 and sunk on 24 September 1922 in a collision with a tug in the Sea of Marmara.
  was a  launched in 1938.  She was sold in 1946 and renamed Speedon, and was broken up at Aden in 1957.
  was a jetfoil launched in 1979 and sold into mercantile service in 1986.

See also
 
 Speedy (disambiguation)

References

Royal Navy ship names